Miloš Radivojević (born 5 April 1990) is a Serbian football defender who plays for Rad.

References

External links
 
 Miloš Radivojević stats at utakmica.rs

1990 births
Footballers from Belgrade
Living people
Serbian footballers
Association football defenders
FK Sinđelić Beograd players
FK BSK Borča players
FK Inđija players
FK Voždovac players
FK Radnički Niš players
FK Rad players
Hapoel Ironi Kiryat Shmona F.C. players
Zira FK players
NK Slaven Belupo players
Serbian First League players
Serbian SuperLiga players
Israeli Premier League players
Azerbaijan Premier League players
Croatian Football League players
Serbian expatriate footballers
Expatriate footballers in Israel
Serbian expatriate sportspeople in Israel
Expatriate footballers in Azerbaijan
Serbian expatriate sportspeople in Azerbaijan
Expatriate footballers in Croatia
Serbian expatriate sportspeople in Croatia